The Man with the Golden Gun may refer to:

 The Man with the Golden Gun (novel), a 1965 Ian Fleming novel
 The Man with the Golden Gun (film), a 1974 film, starring Roger Moore as James Bond
 The Man with the Golden Gun (soundtrack), the soundtrack of the 1974 film
 Francisco Scaramanga, the titular villain of both the novel and the film
 The Man with the Golden Gun (adventure), a 1985 role-playing game adventure for James Bond 007
 "Man With the Golden Gun", an Alice Cooper song released on 1973's Muscle of Love album

See also
The Man with the Golden Winchester, a 1973 Italian film directed by Gianfranco Baldanello
Man with the Golden Pistol, a 1965 Spanish-Italian film also known as Doc, Hands of Steel